Sir David Anthony Haslam CBE FRCP FRCGP FAcadMEd (born 4 July 1949) is a British medical doctor, writer and administrator.

Education
Haslam was educated at the University of Birmingham (MB ChB, DObstRCOG, DFFP).

Medical career
Haslam worked for 36 years as a general practitioner in Ramsey, Cambridgeshire.

He was president of the British Medical Association (2011–12), President (2006-9) and chair (2001-4) of the Royal College of General Practitioners, and vice chair of the Academy of Medical Royal Colleges.
Haslam was chair of the National Institute for Health and Care Excellence from 2013-2019.

In 2020 he became Chair of the Trustee Board of the Charity CLIC Sargent, subsequently known as Young Lives vs Cancer.

He was said by the Health Service Journal to be the 30th most powerful person in the British National Health Service in December 2013. He was ranked (informally, as he was one of the judges) in the Health Service Journal's list of Clinical Leaders in 2015, and later reckoned to be the 15th most influential person in the English NHS in 2015. In 2014 he was listed in the Sunday Times and Debrett's list of the 500 most influential and inspirational people in the UK. 

In 2014 he was appointed Professor of General Practice at the University of Nicosia, and from 2018- 2022 he was a Director of the State Health Services Organisation in Cyprus. 

He has written 14 books, primarily on health and parenting related matters and aimed at the general public, published in 13 languages internationally. His most recent book, "Side Effects. How our healthcare lost its way, and how we fix it" was published in 2022, and was chosen as book of the week in The Observer.

Honours
In 1989 he was awarded Fellowship of the Royal College of General Practitioners, in 2003 he was awarded Fellowship of the Faculty of Public Health, and in 2004 he was awarded Fellowship of the Royal College of Physicians. In 2010 he was conferred as an honorary Fellow of the Academy of Medical Educators. 

In 2014 he received an honorary doctorate from University of Birmingham In 2016 he received a Doctorate of Science (Hon Causa) from the University of East Anglia.

He was awarded CBE in 2004 for "Services to Health Care", and he was Knighted in June 2018 for "Services to NHS Leadership".

References

External links 
 profile at the University of Nicosia Medical School
 information about board members at younglivesvscancer.org.uk

Administrators in the National Health Service
1949 births
Living people
British general practitioners
Commanders of the Order of the British Empire
Fellows of the Royal College of General Practitioners
Honorary Fellows of the Academy of Medical Educators
Alumni of the University of Birmingham
Presidents of the British Medical Association
Knights Bachelor